John Ashton was a merchant and music publisher in Boston, Massachusetts, in the 19th century. He owned a "music & umbrella store" at no.197 Washington Street which sold "all the new and fashionable music" ca.1819-1844. He manufactured and sold musical instruments; tuned pianos; and published and sold sheet music "of marches, waltzes, rondos, variations, quadrilles, gallopades, dances, &c. ... arranged for the band, orchestra, piano forte, guitar, flute, violin, organ &c." Among the composers represented in Ashton's stock: Comer, Joseph Haydn, Knight, Paddon, Russell, Shaw, Webb, Charles Zeuner. The firm "John Ashton & Co." was dissolved on January 1, 1844 with notice that the business will "be continued at the old stand, 197 Washington Street, by E.H. Wade."

References

Images

Further reading
 
 Russell Sanjek. American popular music and its business: the first 400 years; Vol.2: from 1790 to 1909. Oxford University Press, 1988 
 Field Drums blog. "Pre-Civil War John Ashton Eagle Drum." 2009

Published by Ashton
Ashton published numerous sheet music titles. For example:
 Nathan Adams. Ruins of Troy. 1826
 John Holloway. Winthrop's quick step. 1835. "As performed by the Boston Band. ... Dedicated to Capt. G.T. Winthrop, the officers and members of the Boston Independent Fusiliers"
 Charles Zeuner. New England Guards quick step. 1835
 George O. Farmer. Gen. Harrison's grand march. 1840. "Dedicated to the Boston & Roxbury Whig Associations"

External links

 WorldCat. John Ashton & Co.
 Museum of Fine Arts, Boston. Double bass, 1823, instrument made by Abraham Prescott (Deerfield, N.H.), sold by Ashton
 Museum of Fine Arts, Boston. Flute, ca.1830, instrument manufactured/sold by Ashton
 Johns Hopkins University, Lester S. Levy Collection of Sheet Music. Mechanicks Quick Step. 1835.
 Field Drums blog. "J. Ashton Eagle Drum." 2008

Businesspeople from Boston
19th century in Boston
American music publishers (people)
19th-century American businesspeople
Cultural history of Boston
Year of death missing